Oued Zouzfana is an intermittent river, or wadi, that flows through the Oriental region in southeastern Morocco and Béchar Province
 in southwestern Algeria.

Course

The Oued Zouzfana originates in the Atlas Mountains north of the town of Figuig, flows south past Figuig and Béni Ounif, then turns southwest through Taghit and finally to Igli, where it merges with the Oued Guir to form the Oued Saoura.
Oued Zouzfana passes by jbel Sidi Youssef which is located to the south of Figuig. The inhabitants of Figuig still cultivate date palms. Sometimes there are floods of this river. This phenomenon, if we may call it that; Mainly because the Oued Zouzfana is not always carrying water with large quantities, occurs even when there is no rain in the region, since the cause of the flood is far from Figuig and near East side of the Atlas mountains range.

References

Zouzfana
Zouzfana
Geography of Oriental (Morocco)
Geography of Béchar Province
Zouzfana

ar:العربية